An oriel window is a form of bay window which protrudes from the main wall of a building but does not reach to the ground. Supported by corbels, brackets, or similar cantilevers, an oriel window is most commonly found projecting from an upper floor but is also sometimes used on the ground floor.

Oriel windows are seen in Arab architecture in the form of mashrabiya and in Turkish are known as şahnişin or cumba.  In Islamic culture, these windows and balconies project from the street-front of a house, providing an area in which women could peer out and see the activities below while remaining invisible.

Origins 
According to the Oxford English Dictionary, the term oriel is derived from Anglo-Norman  and Late Latin , both meaning "gallery" or "porch", perhaps from Classical Latin  ("curtain").

 Oriel College, Oxford, took its name from a balcony or oriel window forming a feature of a building which occupied the site the college now stands on.
 Oriel Chambers in Liverpool was a very controversial building when it was built, featuring an entire façade of glass oriel windows.

Gallery

See also

 Bay window for more details
 Bow window
 Bretèche
 Turret window

References 

Windows